Peripantostylops is an extinct genus of notoungulate belonging to the family Henricosborniidae that lived during the Eocene in what is now Argentina.

Description

This animal is mostly known from fossilized molars. Those were low-crowned (brachydont) and bunolophodont. The upper molars had an highly developed crochet unlike other genera of Henricosborniidae. The third molar either doesn't have a metastyle or it is weakly developed. For the lower molars, the hypoconulid is less separated from the hypoconid. The entoconid of the third molar was highly developed as an independent cuspid.

Bibliography

Notoungulates
Eocene mammals of South America
Paleogene Argentina
Fossils of Argentina
Fossil taxa described in 1901
Taxa named by Florentino Ameghino
Prehistoric placental genera
Golfo San Jorge Basin
Sarmiento Formation